Ruthvenia is a genus of air-breathing land snails, terrestrial pulmonate gastropod mollusks in the family Charopidae. These snails are restricted to South India and Sri Lanka.

Six species are recognized.

Description
Shell is trochoid to lentiform with compressed structure. Shell color varies from light-comeous to colorless. There are 1 or 2 cord-like keels on last whirl. Aperture narrow with slightly oblique shape. Umbilicus funnel-like and broad.

Species
 Ruthvenia biciliata (Pfeiffer 1854)
 Ruthvenia bicincta (Bavay & Dautzenberg, 1912)
 Ruthvenia caliginosa (Sykes 1898)
 Ruthvenia clathratula (L. Pfeiffer, 1850)
 Ruthvenia clathratuloides (Gude, 1897)
 Ruthvenia retifera (L. Pfeiffer, 1845)

References